Abbey Vale Football Club are a football club based in the village of New Abbey in the historical county of Kirkcudbright shire in the Dumfries and Galloway area of Scotland. They started life as an amateur side called Lochvale F.C. in 1971, but as more players joined from the village, the committee decided to change their name and move to New Abbey in 1974. However, to maintain their place in the Dumfries Amateur League, the new side had to maintain the "Vale" in their title, hence the new club became known as Abbey Vale F.C.

In 2001, the club took a step up in competition and joined the South of Scotland Football League. Their highest league position to date is third, achieved in the 2005–06 and 2021–22 seasons. 

They play their home matches at Maryfield Park, which despite being a fairly undeveloped ground, accommodates up to 1,000 spectators. The changing rooms are named "The David Neil Pavilion", in memory of one of the founder players who died young.

The club's home strip is a yellow and black hooped shirt with black shorts. Their current manager is Frazer Brolls, long term servant of the club, assisted by Alan Clarke who is player/joint manager.

Honours

 Alba Cup: 2022–23
 South of Scotland League Cup: 2017–18
 Tweedie Cup: 2005–06, 2014–15

References

Football clubs in Scotland
Football clubs in Dumfries and Galloway
Association football clubs established in 1974
1974 establishments in Scotland
South of Scotland Football League teams